Cesare Dandini (1 October 1596– 7 February 1657) was an Italian painter of the Baroque period, active mainly in his native city of Florence.

Biography
He was the older brother of the painter Vincenzo Dandini (1609–1675). His nephew, Pietro was a pupil of Vincenzo, and Pietro's two sons, Ottaviano Dandini and the Jesuit priest Vincenzo also worked as painters in Florence. According to the biographer Baldinucci, Cesare first worked under Francesco Curradi, then Cristofano Allori, and finally Domenico Passignano. He enrolled in 1621 in the Accademia del Disegno. His style has the polish and attention to draughtsmanship and design characteristic of Florentines like Carlo Dolci.

Among his pupils were Stefano della Bella, Alessandro Rosi, the landscape painter Antonio Giusti, Giovanni Domenico Ferrucci, and Jacopo Giorgi.

Lost painting found

In 2020, a lost painting by Dandini "Holy Family with the Infant St. John" was found in a church in New Rochelle, New York by Iona College Art History Professor Thomas Ruggio. The rediscovered painting is one of at least four paintings by Dandini that are connected to each other. One is in The Hermitage Museum, and another is in the Metropolitan Museum of Art. The fourth painting was last known to be part of a private collection in New York City.

Gallery

References

Grove encyclopedia abstract
biography

External links
Italian Paintings: Florentine School, a collection catalog containing information about the artist and their works (see pages: 212–213)

1596 births
1657 deaths
17th-century Italian painters
Italian male painters
Painters from Florence
Italian Baroque painters